Rostom (1571–1605), of the Bagrationi Dynasty, was a king of Imereti in the periods of 1588–1589 and 1590–1605. A son of Constantine, sometime claimant to the crown of Imereti, he was raised to the throne through the support of Mamia IV Dadiani, prince of Mingrelia, who had deposed King Leon of Imereti in 1588. Rostom’s authority was defied, however, by his ostensible vassal Giorgi II Gurieli, prince of Guria, who employed an Ottoman force to dethrone the king in favor of Rostom’s relative Bagrat IV. Rostom fled to Mingrelia, from where he continued struggle for the crown. The eastern Georgian king Simon I of Kartli exploited the situation and brought most of Imereti under his control. Rostom fled to Mingrelia, with Manuchar I Dadiani, who rejected Simon's ultimatum and moved into Imereti. He defeated Simon at Opshkviti and ousted him from Imereti in 1590. Rostom was reinstated as king of Imereti and made peace with Simon. His authority was largely nominal though, and the power was effectively held by an aristocratic élite, notably by the prince of Mingrelia. Rostom died childless in 1605 and was succeeded by his half-brother George III.

References

 Вахушти Багратиони (Vakhushti Bagrationi) (1745). История Царства Грузинского: Жизнь Имерети.

1571 births
1605 deaths
Bagrationi dynasty of the Kingdom of Imereti
Kings of Imereti
Eastern Orthodox monarchs